Tashkuiyeh may refer to:
 Tashkuiyeh, Hormozgan (طاشكوييه - Ţāshkūīyeh)
 Tashkuiyeh, Yazd (تاشكوييه - Tāshkūiyeh)